The following lists events that happened during 1828 in Australia.

Incumbents
Monarch - George IV

Governors
Governors of the Australian colonies:
 Governor of New South Wales - Ralph Darling
 Lieutenant-Governor of Tasmania - Colonel George Arthur
 Lieutenant-Governor of Western Australia as a Crown Colony - Captain James Stirling

Events
 13 September - Robbers break into the vault of the Bank of Australasia in Sydney - first bank robbery in Australia.
10 November - Charles Sturt and Hamilton Hume trace the course of the Macquarie River.

Undated
 Australia's first postman, a private servant of George Panton, is appointed Sydney Postmaster.

Exploration and settlement
 Charles Sturt charts the Darling River.
 Batemans Bay, New South Wales surveyed.

Census
Australia's first census was held in November 1828 in the colony of New South Wales.  Previous government statistical reports had been taken from "musters" where inhabitants were brought together for counting.  In 1828, the white population was 36,598 of whom 20,870 were free and 15,728 were convicts.  23.8% of the population were born in the colony.  24.5%  were women. There were 25,248 Protestants and 11,236 Catholics.  Indigenous Australians were not counted.

Of the 36,598, 638 were living in what is now Queensland.  There were also 18,128 people in Tasmania.

References

 
Australia
Years of the 19th century in Australia